The 1992 Campionati Internazionali di Sicilia was a men's tennis tournament played on outdoor clay courts in Palermo, Italy that was part of the World Series of the 1992 ATP Tour. It was the 14th edition of the tournament and took place from 28 September until 4 October 1992. Second-seeded Sergi Bruguera won the singles title.

Finals

Singles

 Sergi Bruguera defeated  Emilio Sánchez 6–1, 6–3
 It was Bruguera's 3rd singles title of the year and the 6th of his career.

Doubles

 Johan Donar /  Ola Jonsson defeated  Horacio de la Peña /  Vojtěch Flégl 5–7, 6–3, 6–4

References

External links
 ITF – tournament edition details

Campionati Internazionali di Sicilia
Campionati Internazionali di Sicilia
Campionati Internazionali di Sicilia